"Cheyenne" is a song by American singer Jason Derulo, released as the second single for his fourth studio album, Everything Is 4 (2015). The song was written by Jason Derulo, Ian Kirkpatrick, Sam Martin, Lindy Robbins, Jason Evigan, Marcus Lomax, Stefan Johnson and Jordan Johnson, while the song's production was handled by The Monsters and the Strangerz and Kirkpatrick.

Jason Lipshutz of Billboard noted the reminiscence of "Cheyenne" to the works by singer Bruno Mars.

Music video
The song's accompanying music video, directed by Syndrome, premiered via Derulo's YouTube channel on June 30, 2015.

The video begins in a mansion where Derulo is seen waking up tied to a chair and glued to the wall. Cheyenne is approaching him as Derulo falls through to a bed where two hands grabbed him as Cheyenne starts frightening sex with Derulo. Then, Derulo ends up in the table as a demon version of Derulo is seen sitting in front of him. Cheyenne kisses the demon Derulo, causing the real Derulo to lift the table. He then finds himself one floor below Cheyenne, but the floor collapses and Cheyenne walks away. Derulo jumps over the gap, looks for Cheyenne and ends up in the bedroom. This is intercut with scenes of Derulo wearing a purple suit and a hat, now Cheyenne activates zombified princess dancers which surround him and they break into an elaborate dance. Meanwhile, Derulo brings pictures of Cheyenne up which are set on fire. The video ends with Derulo on the chair looking at the burned photograph as it ends with a few images of Cheyenne's dark eye.

Derulo describes the character Cheyenne as a "woman in a red dress [that] haunts" him, as seen in the video.

Charts

Certifications

References

External links

2015 songs
2015 singles
American synth-pop songs
Jason Derulo songs
Songs written by Ian Kirkpatrick (record producer)
Songs written by Sam Martin (singer)
Songs written by Lindy Robbins
Songs written by Jason Evigan
Songs written by Marcus Lomax
Songs written by Stefan Johnson
Warner Records singles
Number-one singles in Israel
Song recordings produced by the Monsters & Strangerz
Songs written by Jordan Johnson (songwriter)
Song recordings produced by Ian Kirkpatrick (record producer)